Arum palaestinum is a species of flowering herbaceous perennial plant in the family Araceae and the genus Arum (also known as black calla, Solomon's lily, priest's hood, noo'ah loof and kardi) It is native to the Levant and other parts of the Mediterranean Basin, and has been naturalized in North America, North Africa, Europe, Western Asia, and Australia  The family Araceae includes other well-known plants such as Anthurium, Caladium, and Philodendron.

Arum palaestinum is perhaps best known for it long history in the Middle East as food and for it use in traditional Middle Eastern medicine.

Description

It blooms in the spring, between the months of March and April, by which time the plant is easily recognized by its dark purplish-black spadix enclosed by a reddish-brown spathe.
It is perennial plant.  The leaves of A. palaestinum are light green, narrow, and upright with a purplish-black color. The root is tuberous.

Like other members of the genus Arum, this plant gives off a scent that attracts flies, which distribute the pollen; while most other family members smell like dung and carrion, this plant can smell like rotting fruit as well.

Its Latin name is derived from Palestine, and it is native to the Levant and other parts of the Mediterranean Basin, and has been naturalized in North America, North Africa, Europe, Western Asia, and Australia.

Toxicity
Arum palaestinum is toxic at low doses, and this has traditionally been considered to be due to oxalate salts, but this is not certain. The leaves of the plant contain Calcium oxalate and other toxins that are removing by leaching.  

The symptoms caused by exposure to the raw plant include mucous membrane irritation, and burning, and consuming larger doses causes nausea, diarrhea, and cramping.  Because exposure to skin can cause irritation it is often handled lightly, or with gloves.

History
Engraved drawings of various species of Arum are seen in the Temple of Thutmose III in Karnak (Egypt), depicting the plants when they were brought from Canaan in the year 1447 BCE. The plant is mentioned in the Mishnah, where its cultivation and use as food was described.

Theophrastus' Enquiry into Plants, described the necessity of leaching the roots and leaves before they can be eaten.

The 11th-century Mishnaic exegete Nathan ben Abraham describes the cultivation of the plant in the Levant:
'If arum is covered up with earth in the Seventh Year' (Sheviit 5:2). This arum that is being covered up with earth does not belong to the [prohibition of] Seventh Year produce, but is rather from last year's produce. Its manner is such that when it smells the smell of moisture it sprouts. Therefore, they would bury great quantities [of this plant] together and cover them up with dry earth, and the members of one's household would transfer its leaves to [a place] beneath a roof, so that they will not sprout in the Seventh Year. 'When arum has remained after the Seventh Year' (Sheviit 5:4). This arum is the kind that is called qalqās (Taro), being similar to [the leaves of] ar-rakaf (Cyclamen), but this is better than it, and its leaves are eaten immediately after sprouting, and it grows quickly, but its roots which are the [plant's] main fruit does not finish [its growth] and is suitable [for replanting] even after three years [from the time that it is uprooted and buried in dry soil].

Uses

Food

In Middle Eastern cooking, the leaves are cut up and thoroughly cooked with lemon or sorrel.  It is also used in soups.

It is commonly consumed with flat bread or bulgar, and is reported to have a taste similar to Swiss chard.

Traditional medicine
In traditional medicine among Arabs in Palestine, Arum palaestinum extracts have been used for cancer, intestinal worms, infections in open wounds, urinary tract obstructions, and kidney stones, and are thought to strengthen bones. Jews in Iraq have used it traditionally for worms, skin sores, syphilis, rheumatism, tuberculosis, and diarrhea.  It has also been used for cough and constipation.

Ethnobotanical data have shown that A. palaestinum was reported as one of the most commonly used plants in the West Bank, used by over half of all respondents.

Recent Developments

In a recent revision of his book, Killing Cancer – Not People, author Robert G. Wright discusses one dietary supplement company’s use of Arum palaestinum in one of its products.

References

External links

palaestinum
Plants described in 1854
Flora of Western Asia
Flora of Israel
Flora of Palestine (region)
Flora of Lebanon and Syria
Taxa named by Pierre Edmond Boissier
Middle Eastern cuisine